Siparuna lozaniana is an evergreen dioecious shrub which usually grows to 8 m in height (exceptionally to 16 m). It is found in wet montane forest habitats in central Colombia. It can be distinguished from Colombian congeners such as Siparuna calantha and Siparuna petiolaris by the combination of leathery oblanceolate or obovate leaves and smooth rather than spiny fruits.

References

New species of Siparuna

Siparunaceae
Trees of Colombia
Dioecious plants
Plants described in 2000